"Slowly Slipping Away" is the debut single by Canadian glam metal band Harem Scarem, released in 1991 from their self-titled debut album. "Slowly Slipping Away" is Harem Scarem's biggest hit, reaching No. 25 on the Canadian singles chart. The song also had a music video shot in Ottawa for it.

Band
Harry Hess - vocals
Pete Lesperance – guitar
Mike Gionet - bass guitar
Darren Smith - drums
Ray Coburn - keyboards

References

External links
Harem Scarem | Official website

1991 songs
1991 debut singles
Harem Scarem songs
Glam metal ballads
Warner Music Group singles
1990s ballads